Dunn County is the name of two counties in the United States:

Dunn County, North Dakota 
Dunn County, Wisconsin